Protocolpodes is a genus of ground beetles in the family Carabidae. This genus has a single species, Protocolpodes tratorius. It is found in Madagascar.

References

Platyninae